Brendan Rodgers (born 26 January 1973) is a Northern Irish professional football manager and former player who is the manager of Premier League club Leicester City.

Rodgers began his career as a defender at Ballymena United, where he stayed until he was signed by Reading at the age of 18, although a genetic knee condition forced him to retire at age 20. He remained at Reading as a coach and then academy director, and continued to play non-league football at Newport, Witney Town and Newbury Town for several years. After a period travelling around Spain to study coaching methods, he was invited by José Mourinho to leave Reading and join Chelsea as youth manager in 2004, later being promoted to reserve manager in 2006.

In 2008, he was appointed manager of Watford, where he remained until he accepted an offer to become manager of his former club Reading in 2009. He left the club by mutual consent after some disappointing results six months later. He returned to management with Swansea City in 2010, leading the club to promotion to the Premier League, the first Welsh team to do so, before guiding them to finish 11th the following season. On 1 June 2012, Rodgers accepted an offer to become the new manager of Liverpool, whom he led to runners-up position in the league in the 2013–14 season before his dismissal in October 2015. He became manager of Celtic in May 2016 and led Celtic to an undefeated domestic season in his first year, and trebles in both of his first two seasons. He left Celtic for Leicester City in February 2019, winning the 2021 FA Cup in his second full season.

Early life
Rodgers was born in the seaside village of Carnlough in County Antrim, Northern Ireland. His father Malachy was a painter and decorator, while his mother Christina was a volunteer for the Irish charity Trócaire. Rodgers is the eldest of five boys. His younger brother Malachy became a well-known country-and-western singer locally, and is now pursuing a career in Nashville, Tennessee, United States. He grew up as a supporter of Sheffield Wednesday and Celtic.

Rodgers was brought up a Catholic. He attended St John's Catholic Primary School in Carnlough, and then moved on to St Patrick's College in Ballymena until the age of 16. His mother died in 2010 at the age of 53, and in September 2011 Rodgers was by his father's side when he died of cancer, aged 59.

Playing career
As a teenager, Rodgers represented Northern Ireland at schoolboy level, notably playing against Brazil in 1988. He began his senior career as a defender for Ballymena United, his local team, in 1987. Three years later, at the age of 18, he was signed by Reading where he played in the reserves. His professional playing career was ended when he was 20, due to a genetic knee condition. Following this enforced retirement, Rodgers spent several years playing in non-league football for Newport (IOW), Witney Town and Newbury Town, while remaining as a youth coach at Reading. He found employment at John Lewis to support his young family.

Coaching career
Rodgers spent a large amount of time travelling around Spain studying different coaching methods, and was eventually invited by manager José Mourinho to leave his role of academy director at Reading and join the Chelsea Academy as their head youth coach in 2004 after a recommendation by Mourinho's assistant and future Premier League manager Steve Clarke. Rodgers was promoted to reserve team manager two years later, and was kept in that position by subsequent Chelsea managers Avram Grant and Luiz Felipe Scolari.

Managerial career

Watford
On 24 November 2008, Rodgers left Chelsea to become the manager of Championship club Watford. Rodgers won only two of his first ten league games as manager, leaving Watford in the relegation zone by January. Watford's form dramatically improved, however, and Rodgers was able to guide them to finish 13th, avoiding relegation.

Reading
Weeks after guaranteeing Watford's survival, and following the resignation of Steve Coppell as Reading manager, Rodgers quickly became the favourite to succeed him and rejoin his old club. He initially distanced himself from reports linking him with the job, saying that his "concentration (is) fully on Watford". However, he eventually agreed a deal to become the new manager of Reading on 5 June 2009, after a compensation package worth an initial £500,000 with Watford was agreed, which later rose to £1 million. The Watford Supporters' Trust stated that Rodgers' reputation was "severely damaged" in the eyes of the supporters as a result of the move, but they nevertheless "thanked (Rodgers) for his efforts last season" and "(wished) him well for the future". On 11 August, Rodgers got his first win as Reading manager with a 5–1 win over League Two side Burton Albion in the first round of the League Cup. Despite a good start in the league, a disappointing string of results followed, and Rodgers left Reading by mutual consent on 16 December, just over six months after his arrival, with Reading one place above relegation in the Championship.

Swansea City

Rodgers accepted an offer to become the manager of Championship side Swansea City on 16 July 2010. Prior to this appointment, he had been asked to join the coaching staff at Manchester City under manager Roberto Mancini. His beginning as Swansea manager was very successful, leading to Rodgers being named the Championship Manager of the Month for February 2011 after Swansea won five out of the six league games they played that month, while keeping four clean sheets. By 25 April 2011, Rodgers had managed to comfortably secure Swansea City's place in the 2011 Championship Play-Offs for promotion into the Premier League, with a convincing 4–1 victory over Ipswich Town at the Liberty Stadium.

On 16 May 2011, Rodgers led Swansea to the 2011 Championship Play-Off final as the favourites after defeating underdogs Nottingham Forest over two legs in the semi-final. He faced his old club Reading in the final at Wembley Stadium on 30 May 2011, which Swansea won 4–2 thanks in part to a hat-trick from Scott Sinclair, meaning Swansea became the first Welsh team ever to gain promotion to the Premier League. Rodgers was praised by the media and supporters for consoling Reading manager Brian McDermott and owner John Madejski before receiving the trophy.

Rodgers' first win as a Premier League manager came on 17 September 2011, when Swansea beat West Bromwich Albion 3–0 at the Liberty Stadium. Despite many predicting before the season began that Swansea were favourites to be relegated, their debut season proved very impressive, as they picked up points against Liverpool, Newcastle United, Tottenham Hotspur and Chelsea, keeping them well above the relegation zone. In January 2012, Swansea claimed their first away win of the season at Aston Villa, a month which also saw them beat Arsenal 3–2 at home and hold Chelsea to a 1–1 draw. This saw Rodgers earn his first Premier League Manager of the Month award. In February, Rodgers signed a new three-and-a-half-year contract to keep him at the club until July 2015.

Liverpool

2012–13 season

On 1 June 2012, Rodgers was unveiled as the new Liverpool manager on a three-year contract, following the departure of Kenny Dalglish two weeks prior. Rodgers' appointment was immediately endorsed by former colleague and Real Madrid manager José Mourinho. In July 2012, Rodgers wrote an open letter to the Swansea City supporters, thanking both the staff and supporters for his time at the club, and wishing them well for the future. Days later, Rodgers held his first training session at Melwood as the squad reported back for pre-season training.

On 2 August 2012, Rodgers oversaw his first competitive game as Liverpool manager, a 1–0 win in the UEFA Europa League against Belarusian club Gomel, and won his first home game in charge in the second leg one week later. In his first league game as manager on 18 August, Liverpool lost 3–0 against West Brom at The Hawthorns. His first win in the league came against Norwich City at Carrow Road, Liverpool winning 5–2. On 31 October, Rodgers welcomed his former club Swansea to Anfield in the fourth round of the League Cup, a match Liverpool lost 3–1. On 6 December, Liverpool defeated Udinese 1–0 away in the Europa League to qualify for the round of 32 as group winners.

On 27 January 2013, Liverpool were knocked out of the FA Cup in the fourth round, surprisingly losing 3–2 to League One team Oldham Athletic. Liverpool finished in seventh position in the Premier League in his first season in charge, one position higher than the previous season.

2013–14 season
At the start of the 2013–14 season, Rodgers was named the Premier League Manager of the Month for August 2013 as Liverpool won their first three league games of the season. In January 2014, he was fined £8,000 after making comments about referee Lee Mason after a 2–1 loss to Manchester City in December 2013. He was later named Manager of the Month for the second time that season for March 2014, after Liverpool won all five of their games that month to go top of the Premier League.

A run of 11-straight wins for Liverpool left them five points clear at the top of the Premier League with just three matches to play. However, they then suffered a 2–0 home defeat to Chelsea on 27 April. This result handed the advantage to Manchester City in the title race. In their next game away to Crystal Palace on 5 May, Liverpool led 3–0 with 11 minutes to go, but the game finished 3–3. Liverpool ended the season as Premier League runners-up, two points behind champions Manchester City.

Liverpool scored 101 league goals in the season, the club's most since the 1895–96 season and the third-highest in Premier League history. Later that month, Rodgers was named the LMA Manager of the Year, becoming the first Liverpool manager to win the accolade in its 20-year history. On 26 May 2014, Rodgers signed a new four-year contract at Liverpool.

2014–15 season
Liverpool were eliminated from the 2014–15 UEFA Champions League after drawing against Basel in their final group match, dropping into the Europa League. The Reds were subsequently knocked out in the Europa League round of 32 after losing 4–5 on penalties to Turkish side Beşiktaş. On 19 April 2015, Liverpool were defeated by Aston Villa in the FA Cup semi-final. Liverpool finished the season with a 6–1 defeat to Stoke, finishing sixth in the Premier League. This meant Rodgers became the first Liverpool manager since the 1950s not to win a trophy after three seasons in charge. Despite this, Rodgers received the backing of Liverpool's owners.

2015–16 season
On 4 October 2015, Liverpool played their 225th Merseyside derby against Everton with the game ending again in a 1–1 draw. This was the fifth time in Liverpool's previous six games that they had taken a 1–0 lead, then to have the game end in a 1–1 draw; while they had just one win in their previous nine games. Just one hour after the game, Rodgers was sacked, leaving Liverpool in tenth place after eight matches played. Later, it became known that the decision to sack him had already been made prior to the match against Everton. The following day, Rodgers released a statement through the League Managers Association stating, "I am, of course, incredibly disappointed to be leaving... [but] it has been both an honour and a privilege to manage one of the game's great clubs."

Rodgers' signings for Liverpool included James Milner, Roberto Firmino, Philippe Coutinho, Adam Lallana, Joe Gomez, Dejan Lovren, Divock Origi and Mario Balotelli.

Celtic

2016–17 season

Rodgers was appointed manager of Scottish Premiership champions Celtic on a 12-month rolling contract on 20 May 2016, following the exit of Ronny Deila. Upon his arrival in Glasgow, Rodgers spoke of his admiration for the late Tommy Burns, the former Celtic player and manager who was in charge of Reading when Rodgers began his coaching career.

On 12 July, in his first competitive game in charge, Celtic lost 1–0 away to Gibraltar's Lincoln Red Imps in the first leg of their second qualifying round of the 2016–17 Champions League. He said of the surprise result, "There is obvious disappointment. There is no embarrassment." Celtic overcame their one-goal deficit with a 3–0 win at Celtic Park. On 23 August 2016, Celtic qualified for the group stage of the 2016–17 Champions League for the first time in three years after a 5–4 aggregate victory over Hapoel Be'er Sheva. In the first game of the group stage, 13 September 2016, Rodgers suffered a 7–0 defeat against Barcelona at Camp Nou, this was Brendan Rodgers' heaviest defeat and the worst result for Celtic in European competition.

On 27 November 2016, Rodgers won his first trophy as a manager as Celtic beat Aberdeen 3–0 in the final of the Scottish League Cup. The win also gave Celtic their 100th major trophy.

On 31 December 2016, Rodgers became the first manager in Celtic history to win his opening three games against Rangers. This victory meant Celtic went 19 points clear, with a game in hand, in the 2016–17 Scottish Premiership table. It also secured Celtic their 5th consecutive league victory, 58 points from a possible 60, and stretched their unbeaten run in domestic football to 24 games.

On 2 April 2017, Celtic defeated Hearts 5–0 to secure the club's sixth consecutive league title, with eight games to spare. Five days later, Rodgers signed a new four-year contract with Celtic.

As Celtic's unbeaten domestic run continued, they subjected Rangers to their heaviest defeat at Ibrox since 1915, thrashing their rivals 5–1 on 29 April. Celtic's 2–0 win over Hearts on 21 May saw them finish 30 points ahead of second-placed Aberdeen in the league with a record 106 points, and the team become the first Scottish side to complete a top-flight season undefeated since 1899. On 27 May 2017, Celtic defeated Aberdeen 2–1 to win the Scottish Cup, securing a domestic treble for the fourth time in their history, and ending the 2016–17 season unbeaten in all domestic competitions.

2017–18 season

On 4 November 2017, Rodgers guided Celtic to a 4–0 victory over St Johnstone. This victory meant Celtic were unbeaten for their last 63 domestic games. The victory also meant they surpassed the 100-year British-held recorded for consecutive domestic games undefeated, which was also held by Willie Maley's Celtic team, set in 1917 at 62. On 26 November 2017, Rodgers won his fourth trophy in a row as a manager as Celtic beat Motherwell 2–0 in the 2017 Scottish League Cup Final. Rodgers became the first manager in the club's history to win his first four domestic trophies and also stretch the unbeaten domestic record to 65 games. This unbeaten run finally ended after 69 games, with a 4–0 loss to Hearts.

On 29 April 2018, Rodgers secured his second and Celtic's seventh consecutive league title with a 5–0 win against Rangers at Celtic Park. This win also extended Celtic's unbeaten run against Rangers to 12 games. The season ended with Rodgers winning the first 'Double Treble' (a treble in two consecutive seasons) in Scottish football history with a 2–0 Scottish Cup Final win over Motherwell on 19 May 2018.

2018–19 season

Rodgers said that he turned down an approach from a Chinese club during the summer of 2018. He told BBC Scotland: "With China it's big money, but I've found happiness here." After failing to qualify for the Champions League, Celtic qualified in second place from the group stage of the UEFA Europa League. They were knocked out by Valencia in the round of 32, 3–0 on aggregate. Celtic won the Scottish League Cup in December 2018, Rodgers' seventh successive trophy with the club. In February 2019, with Celtic leading the Premiership by eight points, Rodgers departed Celtic, joining English Premier League club Leicester City.

Leicester City

2018–19 season
In February 2019, Rodgers was appointed manager of Leicester City, following the sacking of Claude Puel. Rodgers' first game in charge of The Foxes was on 3 March 2019 away against former club Watford. The game ended in a 2–1 defeat, with Andre Gray scoring a 92nd-minute winner for the Hornets. In Rodgers' home debut, his second game in charge, Leicester won 3–1 over struggling Fulham. Striker Jamie Vardy scored his 100th goal for the club in the match.

2019–20 season
On 6 December 2019, Rodgers signed a contract extension keeping him at the club until 2025. At the point of signing the deal, his team had recorded 7 wins in a row and sat second in the table after 15 Premier League games. In his first full season, Rodgers guided Leicester to fifth place and therefore qualifying for the UEFA Europa League group stage.

2020–21 season
They started the 2020–21 season strongly, beating Manchester City 5–2 away from home on 27 September 2020, meaning that Rodgers is the first manager whose team have scored 5 goals against a team managed by Pep Guardiola. In Europe, Leicester managed to win the Europa League group with Braga, AEK Athens and Zorya Luhansk to progress to the round of 16, but they were eliminated by Slavia Prague after a 0–0 away draw in Czech Republic and a 0–2 home loss.

On 15 May 2021, he led Leicester City to win the first FA Cup title in their history, after a 1–0 win over Chelsea in the final. The end of the season in the league saw a fierce battle between Leicester, Chelsea and Liverpool for the remaining UEFA Champions League spots. Despite being in third place for most of the season, a 1–2 loss to Chelsea in the penultimate round saw Leicester drop to 5th place after Liverpool's 3–0 defeat of Burnley, with Leicester and Liverpool tied on points and Chelsea up in third via a solitary point. Despite Chelsea's 1–2 loss against Aston Villa giving them a chance to a fourth-place finish, Leicester couldn't take advantage due to a dramatic 2–4 loss to Tottenham Hotspur after maintaining a 2–1 lead until Kasper Schmeichel's own goal in the 76th minute, coupled with a brace from Gareth Bale. Thus, Leicester once again finished fifth, qualifying for the Europa League.

2022–23 season
In March 2023, with the club two points above the relegation zone, Rodgers said that he respected the opinions of fans calling for him to be sacked.

Management style
Rodgers believes in his teams keeping possession of the ball and playing a flowing passing and attacking game with the ball always moving; defensively, he likes his team to put a lot of pressure on the opposing team.

His Liverpool team during the 2013–14 season interchanged from 4–5–1 to 3–5–2 to 4–4–2 to 4–3–3 to a diamond formation. Steven Gerrard described Rodgers' one-on-one management as the best he had seen.

Personal life
Rodgers separated from his wife, Susan, in the summer of 2014; the couple divorced in December 2015. They have two children – a son, Anton, also a footballer, and a daughter, Mischa. Rodgers got engaged to Charlotte Searle in February 2016, and they married in June 2017. He is a boyhood Celtic fan. On 6 March 2019, thieves broke into his home in Glasgow, stealing family possessions and medals he won at Celtic.

In June 2011, Rodgers joined a team representing the Football League to climb Mount Kilimanjaro in aid of Marie Curie Cancer Care in honour of his mother – who died in 2010 – and his father – who died of cancer in 2011. In June 2014, he was awarded an honorary Doctor of Science degree by the University of Ulster.

Rodgers speaks Spanish and Italian. His nickname is "Buck Rodgers", after the comic strip character Buck Rogers.

In May 2020, Rodgers said that he and his wife had tested positive for COVID-19 in March the same year after showing symptoms during the COVID-19 pandemic – both of them made full recoveries. Rodgers likened his breathing difficulties to the altitude when he climbed Mount Kilimanjaro. The couple endured losses in smell, taste, and strength for three weeks before being tested positive.

Managerial statistics

Honours

Manager
Swansea City
Football League Championship play-offs: 2011

Celtic
Scottish Premiership: 2016–17, 2017–18
Scottish Cup: 2016–17, 2017–18
Scottish League Cup: 2016–17, 2017–18, 2018–19

Leicester City
FA Cup: 2020–21
 FA Community Shield: 2021

Individual
LMA Manager of the Year: 2013–14
PFA Scotland Manager of the Year: 2016–17
SFWA Manager of the Year: 2016–17
Scottish Premiership Manager of the Season: 2016–17, 2017–18
Premier League Manager of the Month: January 2012, August 2013, March 2014
Football League Championship Manager of the Month: February 2011
Scottish Premiership Manager of the Month: August 2016, October 2016, December 2016, April 2017, September 2017

References

External links

Manager Profile - Brendan Rodgers LFC History

1973 births
Living people
Sportspeople from County Antrim
Association footballers from Northern Ireland
Association football defenders
Ballymena United F.C. players
Reading F.C. players
Newport (IOW) F.C. players
Witney Town F.C. players
Newbury Town F.C. players
Northern Ireland youth international footballers
Republic of Ireland youth international footballers
Football managers from Northern Ireland
Watford F.C. managers
Reading F.C. managers
Swansea City A.F.C. managers
Liverpool F.C. managers
Celtic F.C. managers
Leicester City F.C. managers
English Football League managers
Premier League managers
Scottish Professional Football League managers
FA Cup winning managers
Association football coaches
Reading F.C. non-playing staff
Chelsea F.C. non-playing staff